Muhammad Sabani (born October 15, 1977) is an Indonesian footballer who currently plays for PSAP Sigli in the Indonesia Super League. Sabani is married to Melysa Fitri and has two children, Falah and Balqis. He started his career by joining the Mercu Buana football team in Medan. Before he became a player, Sabani was a tea delivery boy. He delivered tea bottles to the Mercu Buana dormitory and by chance met a local coach who offered to train him as a goal keeper. Before a year had passed, he was accepted as a player in PSMS Medan in 1998. Since that he has played in many teams, including Barito Putra, Petro Kimia, Persija Jakarta, Persmin Minahasa, Persijap Jepara, Persiraja Banda Aceh, Persik Kediri and PSAP Sigli.

Bio Data

References

External links

1977 births
Association football goalkeepers
Living people
Indonesian footballers
Liga 1 (Indonesia) players
PSAP Sigli players
Indonesian Premier Division players
PSMS Medan players
Sportspeople from Medan